The 2005 Asian Canoe Slalom Championships were the 4th Asian Canoe Slalom Championships and took place from July 1–2, 2005 in Naein-chun, Inje, South Korea.

Medal summary

Medal table

References

Men's C-1
Men's C-2
Men's K-1
Women's K-1

External links
Official ACC site

Canoe
Asian Canoe Slalom Championships
Asian Canoeing Championships
International sports competitions hosted by South Korea